Sartène (or  ) is a commune in the department of Corse-du-Sud on the island of Corsica, France.

Its history dates back to medieval times and granite buildings from the early 16th century still line some of the streets. One of the main incidents in the town's history was an attack by pirates from Algiers in 1583, after which 400 people were taken away. These attacks continued into the 18th century.

The town is centred on the Place de la Liberation (previously the Place Porta), at the edge of which is the church of Sainte Marie. The town allows good views across the valley. Sartène wine is appreciated by wine connoisseurs for its good quality.

Sartène has given its name to one of the southern Corsican dialects a variety of which is the Gallurese spoken in North Sardinia.

Geography

Climate
Sartène has a mediterranean climate (Köppen climate classification Csa).

Population

Sights
Genoese towers in the commune of Sartène:
 Torra di Roccapina
 Torra di Senetosa
 Torra di Tizzà

There are numerous archaeological sites in the commune or Sartène:

 A Figa
 Apazzu
 Cardiccia
 Casteddu di Puzzonu
 Cauria
 Funtanaccia
 Paddaghju
 Rinaghju
 Stantari

See also
 Communes of the Corse-du-Sud department

References

External links
 A page on the history of the town
  Corsican Dolmens 

Communes of Corse-du-Sud
Subprefectures in France